Animals is a peer-reviewed open-access scientific journal that covers all areas of animal biology, including behavior, physiology, genetics, and ecology. It is published by MDPI and was established in 2011. The editor-in-chief is Clive J. C. Phillips ( Estonian University of Life Sciences and Curtin University).

The journal publishes original research articles, review articles, and short communications.

Abstracting and indexing
The journal is abstracted and indexed in:

According to the Journal Citation Reports, the journal has a 2021 impact factor of 3.231.

References

External link 

Zoology journals
English-language journals
MDPI academic journals
Publications established in 2011
Continuous journals
Creative Commons Attribution-licensed journals